A long firm fraud (also known as a consumer credit fraud) is a crime that uses a trading company set up for fraudulent purposes; the basic operation is to run the company as an apparently legitimate business by buying goods and paying suppliers promptly to secure a good credit record. Once they are sufficiently well-established, the perpetrators purchase the next round of goods on credit, then decamp with the goods and profits from previous sales. The goods can then be sold elsewhere. The procedure needs a certain amount of money to set up, often the proceeds from another crime or a previous long firm. Sometimes an individual who does time in jail for assisting the fraud is paid for the time served. Long firm frauds have become significantly less common in recent years since it is no longer possible to operate for any length of time without leaving a significant paper trail.

References

Confidence tricks
Fraud